Final Call may refer to:
The Final Call, Nation of Islam newspaper
The Final Call (TV series), a 2019 Indian web television thriller series

Music
Final Call (album), by Japanese New Age recording artist Kitaro
Final Call (The Lost Tapes), AZ (rapper)
The Final Call (Matt Tilley album), comedy calls
The Final Call, a 2001 album by Hawkwind bassist Alan Davey
"Final Call", a song by Thirteen Senses from Contact
"Final Call", a Japanese song from Monsters
"Final Call", a song by Luciano from Sweep Over My Soul
"The Final Call", song from Black Market Militia
"Final Call", a song by Rahowa from Declaration of War
"Final Call", a song by Noisettes from Contact